Fredrick Latham (born 1876) was an English footballer who played in the Football League for Crewe Alexandra and Stoke.

Career
Latham was born in Crewe and began his career with local side Crewe Alexandra. He spent two years with the "Alex" making 21 appearances before joining Stoke in August 1896. Stoke were at the time experiencing an goalkeeping injury crisis and Latham was recruited to fill a temporary gap. He played in all of Stoke's five matches in September 1896 before returning to Crewe.

Affectionately known as the 'human octopus', he also kept goal for Stafford Rangers, Darlaston, Brierley Hill and Stalybridge Rovers where he had the misfortune to fracture his jaw.  Became a referee after hanging up his gloves.

Career statistics

References

English footballers
Crewe Alexandra F.C. players
Stoke City F.C. players
Bristol Rovers F.C. players
English Football League players
1876 births
Year of death missing
Sportspeople from Crewe
Association football goalkeepers